Boyacá is a simple station that is part of the TransMilenio mass-transit system of Bogotá, Colombia.

Location 
The station is located in northwestern Bogotá, specifically on Avenida Calle 80 with Transversal 69 B, one block from Avenida Boyacá.

It serves the Santa Rosa and Bonanza neighborhoods.

History 
In 2000, phase one of the TransMilenio system was opened between Portal de la 80 and Tercer Milenio, including this station.

The station is named Boyacá due to its proximity to Avenida Boyacá.

Station services

Old trunk services

Main line service

Feeder routes 
This station does not have feeder routes.

Inter-city service 
This station does not have inter-city service.

See also 
 List of TransMilenio stations

TransMilenio